Pinang Kampai Airport  is a domestic airport located at Dumai, a city in Riau province. It serves Dumai and surrounding areas. This airport serves flights to and from several cities and towns in Indonesia. This airport is able to serve Boeing 737 Classic.

History
The airport was built by Pertamina, the state oil company of Indonesia to support its operations in the Dumai area. Since the 1980s, the airport has also served charter flights for Chevron Pacific Indonesia, formerly Caltex Pacific Indonesia. These flights are served by Pertamina subsidiary Pelita Air. Since 2009, Pertamina managed the airport together with Dumai city government . After that, some commercial airlines open routes from and to Dumai, though there is only a few airlines fly to Pinang Kampai Airport, but this airport experienced more than double the number of passengers in every year. As of 21 December 2017, the airport is officially managed by PT Pelita Air Service again after the contract expired with Dumai city government, but commercial flight activities are still allowed.

Airport facilities
Terminal facilities include:

Airport cafe
Restaurant
Check-in counter
X-ray baggage scanner

Airside and landside facilities include:
Jet A-1
Runway light
Apron light
Non-directional beacon (NDB) navigation
Car park
Apron
ATC tower
Helicopter hangar
Helipad

Airlines and destinations

Statistics and traffic

Traffic

Statistics

References

Dumai
Airports in Riau